Demetrius Zvonimir (died 1089) was a King of Dalmatia and Croatia from 1076 until his death in 1089. He was crowned as king in Solin on 8 October 1076. Zvonimir also served as Ban of Croatia (1064–1074), and was named Duke of Croatia in around 1075. His native name was Zvonimir; he adopted the forename Demetrius at his coronation.

He first served as ban in the service of King Peter Krešimir IV. Afterwards, Peter Krešimir IV appointed him duke and declared him as his heir. In 1075, Demetrius Zvonimir succeeded to the Croatian throne through papal diplomacy. His reign is characterized as relatively peaceful, with no extensive war campaigns; he focused instead on Croatia's economic and cultural development. He inherited the Croatian state at its height and ruled from the city of Knin. Medieval legends allege his assassination; his death and succession are subjects of controversy in Croatian historiography. His reign was followed by a period of anarchy, which ended with the ascension of the Hungarian Árpád dynasty and the creation of a union with Hungary.

Early years
Zvonimir's exact origin and background are uncertain. It is known that he had a magister (Latin for "teacher") named "Šestak", who also contributed to building monasteries around Croatia; that his maternal uncle was named Streza; and that his family owned some estates near Biograd. Some historians have proposed that he is a descendant of Svetoslav Suronja, whose relatives fled Venice and sought refuge in Hungary. This allowed for the thesis that he began his career as Ban of Slavonia.

Banates of Slavonia and Croatia
During the reign of King Peter Krešimir IV, his relative through the Orseoli family of Venice, it is conjectured that Zvonimir initially administered Slavonia, specifically the land between the rivers Drava and Sava, with the title of ban. The term "Slavonia" at the time referred to both modern day Slavonia and North-West Croatia.

The neighboring Holy Roman Empire under Henry IV invaded Hungary in 1063 to restore Solomon to the throne. Hungary was then ruled by Béla I, whose third daughter Helen was married to Zvonimir. According to Chronicon Pictum, Croatia was also attacked around 1067 by the Carantanian army of Ulric I, who occupied a part of Kvarner and the eastern coast of Istria, the "March of Dalmatia". Since the Croatian king was preoccupied with rebellion in Dalmatia, due to the prohibition of Slavic liturgy, Zvonimir was compelled to seek protection from Solomon, King of Hungary instead. Géza I and Solomon helped Zvonimir in restoring authority in the March of Dalmatia. After they jointly repelled the Carantanians from Croatia, Ban Zvonimir sent gifts to Solomon as a sign of gratitude. Shortly afterwards in 1070 Zvonimir is first mentioned as a Ban of Croatia in charters from Zadar, succeeding Gojko. Croatian charters at the time were issued in the names of both King Peter Krešimir and Ban Zvonimir.
At the beginning of 1075, Zvonimir held the title of "Duke of Croatia"; this gave him the rule of northern Dalmatia, and made him chief adviser to the reigning king and his heir. In that same year, Normans from southern Italy, led by Count Amico of Giovinazzo, invaded Croatia and captured a certain Croatian king whose name is not mentioned, most likely King Peter Krešimir, who died soon after. About the middle of 1075, Zvonimir regained the allegiance of the coastal cities of Dalmatia which had been lost to the Normans. Meanwhile, another contender for the throne, Stephen Trpimirović, who had also been the Duke of Croatia, relinquished his claim and relocated to the Church of Saint Stephen beneath the pines in the vicinity of Split, where he was to live a secluded life. This opened Zvonimir's path to the throne, with support from Pope Gregory VII.

Reign as king

Zvonimir was crowned on 8 October 1076 at Solin in the Basilica of Saint Peter and Moses (known today as the Hollow Church) by a representative of Pope Gregory VII (1073–1085). Zvonimir took an oath of fealty to the Pope, promising to support the implementation of the Church reforms in Croatia. After his coronation, Zvonimir in 1076 gave the Benedictine monastery of Saint Gregory in Vrana to the Pope, both as a sign of loyalty and as accommodation for papal legates visiting Croatia. The title of Zvonimir was "King of Croatia and Dalmatia", while his name and title in Croatian, as found on the Baška tablet, was "Zvonimir, kral hrvatski", in Glagolitic script zvъnъmirъ, kralъ xrъvatъskъ. He took the Christian name of "Demetrius" at the coronation, most likely after the saint Pope Demetrius I of Alexandria.

Following Zvonimir's coronation, the papal legates summoned a church council in Split, which reiterated the ban on the use of Slavic in liturgy and the condemnation of the Cyrillic alphabet, which the council of 1060 had branded as heresy. The king instituted the Gregorian reform; he also promised the eventual abolition of slavery, but with little success (see Supetar cartulary). He maintained authority over Dalmatia, which could be felt as far as the distant town of Osor on the island of Cres, where he is referenced in a 1082 lauda. He continued the expansive and pro-Roman policies of his predecessor, maintaining a close alliance with the papacy. He made significant donations to the Archbishopric of Split whose head Lawrence had also been his personal advisor.

Demetrius Zvonimir sought to gain firmer control of his kingdom by ousting various local nobles (hereditary provincial leaders and landlords) from local administration and replacing them with his own supporters, court nobles and, reflecting his close papal ties, high clerics. The provincial nobles were governing their provinces (županije) with a significant level of internal independence. In 1080, he bethrothed his daughter Klaudija to the noble Vonick of the Lapčan tribe, to whom he also granted the county (županija) of Karin as a dowry.

Around 1079, tensions arose between Croatia and the neighboring Holy Roman Empire, whose duke Vecelin (a servant of emperor Henry IV) was preparing for an attack on Croatia from his estates in Istria. The pope intervened on behalf of Zvonimir, urging Vecelin to make any complaint to him directly regarding any issues with the king. The Annales Carinthiæ and Chronica Hungarorum record that Zvonimir eventually invaded Carinthia to aid Hungary in war between 1079 and 1083, but this is disputed. Demetrius Zvonimir also took a hard line against the Byzantine Empire, but, unlike Peter Krešimir IV, he was also an ally of the Normans, with whom he joined in wars against Byzantium. When Robert Guiscard, Duke of Apulia, invaded the western Balkan provinces of the empire in 1084, Zvonimir sent troops to his aid.

Death and succession

There are several versions of Zvonimir's death. The 13th century chronicler Thomas the Archdeacon and a charter of king Stephen II, said to have been issued closely after his death in 1089, both assert that Zvonimir died of natural causes. This view had been mostly accepted in modern historiography. Various later sources give the date 20 April of the year 1089 as the date of his death. They also name the village of Kosovo (today's Biskupija near Knin) and the place by the basilica of Saint Cecillia as the place of death. These sources were typically associated with the allegations of his assassination, now believed to be a medieval legend.

He was most likely initially buried in the church of St. Mary near his capital Knin, while his remains were transferred to the nearby Kapitul in Knin, and were subsequently lost during the Ottoman conquest and destruction in the 16th century.

Demetrius Zvonimir was married to his distant relative Jelena, the sister of Ladislaus I of Hungary. Through Helen, he was connected to the royal families of not only Hungary, but also Poland, Denmark, Bulgaria, and Byzantium. She bore him a son, Radovan, who predeceased him, and a daughter, Claudia, who was married to the vojvoda Vniha Lapčan. Since Zvonimir died without leaving an heir from his posterity; he was succeeded by Stephen II, last of the House of Trpimirović. Stephen II ruled briefly until his death in 1091, at which point Ladislaus became the best candidate for the succession.

Croatia subsequently entered a period of anarchy, with various sides and nobles fighting over supremacy in the kingdom. The 14th century chronicle Chronicon Pictum narrates that, after Zvonimir's death, his widow had requested her brother Ladislaus to intervene. Historia Salonitana instead claims it was one of the Slavonian nobles that had approached and requested his intervention.

Legacy

Demetrius Zvonimir is viewed in contemporary Croatia as the last native king who held any real power and is regarded as one of the national heroes from the medieval period. The untimely death of his son, Radovan, and the short reign of Stephen II plunged Croatia into anarchy and resulted in a union with Hungary, which would last until 1918.

The culturally and historically significant Baška tablet was inscribed shortly after his death and contains references to him and a number of his nobles of the 11th century. For the first time, the Baška tablet mentions the title of Croatian kings in Croatian: kral (kralj in modern Croatian). His name is also contained in the 11th or 12th-century Jurandvor fragments from the same church in Baška, on the island of Krk.

Legend about death
A 13th century Polish–Hungarian Chronicle is the earliest source to allege his murder. It justifies Ladislaus' conquest of Croatia as Zvonimir's avenger.

Another account, from the Croatian redaction of the 13th century Chronicle of the Priest of Duklja, says that in 1089, desiring to heal the East-West Schism Pope Urban II asked Zvonimir, his strongest Balkan ally, to assist Alexios I Komnenos against the Seljuks. Zvonimir convened the Sabor at a place called "seven churches in Kosovo", which had been identified by the archaeologists as Biskupija near Knin. His intention was to mobilize the army on behalf of the pope and the emperor, but the nobility refused him and a rebellion erupted, leading to Zvonimir's assassination at the hands of his own soldiers.

Ivan Tomašić's Chronicon breve Regni Croatiae of 1563, in an otherwise identical account, names the assassin as the king's personal chaplain Tadija Slovinac, who entered the king's tent located by the Basillica of Saint Cecillia in Kosovo and killed him in his sleep upon the insistence of the population. Tomašić also records that his remains were located in the Church of Saint Bartholomew in Kapitul in the outskirts of Knin.

Various other sources of the 16th century record similar events, among which an epitaph ascribed to his grave was recorded:

His death marked the collapse of Croatian royal power. The myth of the "Curse of King Zvonimir" is based on the legend of his assassination. Historian Johannes Lucius was the first to dismiss these claims in his 1673 historiographical work De regno Dalmatiae et Croatiae ("On the Kingdom of Dalmatia and Croatia").

Modern
"Zvonimir" is today a traditional and quite common Croatian name, meaning "sound, chime" (zvoni) and "peace, prestige" (mir), King Zvonimir being the first recorded bearer of the name. The Grand Order of King Dmitar Zvonimir, which is awarded to high-ranking officials, is named after him, as are many streets in Croatia. The Croatian Navy's flagship and its most modern ship, Kralj Dmitar Zvonimir (RTOP-12), was also named after the late king.

Family
In c. 1063 Zvonimir married Helen, daughter of Béla I of Hungary and his wife Richeza of Poland. They had three children:
 Radovan (c. 1065 – 1083/1089), designated heir, but died before 1089
 Claudia, wife of Vonick, Voivode of Lapčani, Lika
 Vinica, wife of Michael (?)

See also 
Crown of Zvonimir
Medal of the Crown of King Zvonimir
Hollow Church
List of rulers of Croatia

Notes

References

Literature
Nemet, Dražen; Death of Croatian king Zvonimir – problem, sources and interpretation
 Gunjača, Stjepan; Ispravci i dopune u starijoj hrvatskoj historiji, Zagreb, Školska knjiga, 1973–1978
 John Van Antwerp Fine; The Early Medieval Balkans: A Critical Survey from the Sixth to the Late Twelfth Century, 1991
 Florin Curta; Southeastern Europe in the Middle Ages, 500–1250

External links

  August Šenoa – In the memorial of 800th anniversary of Zvonimir's coronation
 Zvonimir on Royal Croatia
 Arhinet – "rex Chrobatorum et Dalmatinorum, rex (tocius) Chroacie atque Dalmacie, Chroatorum atque Dalmatinorum rex"

Trpimirović dynasty
11th-century births
1089 deaths
Kings of Croatia
Bans of Slavonia
Medieval Croatian nobility
11th-century monarchs in Europe
Roman Catholic monarchs
11th-century Croatian people
Burials at the Church of St. Mary, Knin